The 2014 FIFA World Cup qualification UEFA Group F was a UEFA qualifying group for the 2014 FIFA World Cup. The group was one of nine qualifying groups from UEFA and comprised Azerbaijan, Israel, Luxembourg, Northern Ireland, Portugal and Russia.

The group winners, Russia, qualified directly for the 2014 FIFA World Cup. Portugal placed among the eight best runners-up and advanced to the play-offs, where they were drawn to play home-and-away matches against Sweden. They won both matches and thus also qualified for the World Cup.

Standings

Matches
The match schedule was determined at a meeting in Luxembourg City, Luxembourg, on 25 November 2011.

Notes

Goalscorers
There were 82 goals in 30 matches, for an average of 2.73 goals per match.

6 goals

 Eden Ben Basat
 Tomer Hemed
 Hélder Postiga

5 goals

 Aleksandr Kerzhakov

4 goals

 Bruno Alves
 Cristiano Ronaldo
 Aleksandr Kokorin

3 goals

 Viktor Fayzulin
 Roman Shirokov

2 goals

 Ruslan Abishov
 Stefano Bensi
 Daniel da Mota
 Aurélien Joachim
 Gareth McAuley
 Martin Paterson
 Silvestre Varela
 Denis Glushakov
 Aleksandr Samedov

1 goal

 Rauf Aliyev
 Rahid Amirguliyev
 Rufat Dadashov
 Vagif Javadov
 Mahir Shukurov
 Rami Gershon
 Maor Melikson
 Bibras Natcho
 Maharan Radi
 Lior Refaelov
 Itay Shechter
 Eran Zahavi
 Mathias Jänisch
 Steven Davis
 David Healy
 Niall McGinn
 Dean Shiels
 Jamie Ward
 Hugo Almeida
 Fábio Coentrão
 Ricardo Costa
 Nani
 Vasili Berezutski

Discipline

References

External links
Results and schedule for UEFA Group F (FIFA.com version)
Results and schedule for UEFA Group F (UEFA.com version)

F
2012–13 in Russian football
qual
2012–13 in Northern Ireland association football
2013–14 in Northern Ireland association football
2012–13 in Portuguese football
qual
2012–13 in Azerbaijani football
2013–14 in Azerbaijani football
2012–13 in Israeli football
2013–14 in Israeli football
2012–13 in Luxembourgian football
2013–14 in Luxembourgian football